The electoral district of Oakleigh is an electoral district of the Victorian Legislative Assembly. It covers the south-east Melbourne suburbs of Carnegie, Murrumbeena, Hughesdale, Notting Hill, Oakleigh East, Oakleigh and parts of Chadstone, Glen Waverley, Mount Waverley, Glen Huntly, Mulgrave and Ormond.

The seat is Labor Party held within the inner south-east metropolitan Melbourne.

Steve Dimopoulos is the current member of parliament for Oakleigh.

Members for Oakleigh

Election results

External links
 Electorate profile: Oakleigh District, Victorian Electoral Commission

References

Electoral districts of Victoria (Australia)
1927 establishments in Australia
City of Monash
City of Glen Eira
Electoral districts and divisions of Greater Melbourne